William Andrew Quinn (27 July 1890 – 1 November 1969) was an Australian rules footballer who played with Melbourne in the Victorian Football League (VFL).

Notes

External links 

1890 births
1969 deaths
Australian rules footballers from Victoria (Australia)
Melbourne Football Club players
People from Yarra Ranges